Synodus usitatus is a species of lizardfish that lives mainly in the indo-west pacific.

References
 

Synodontidae
Fish described in 1981